USS R-15 (SS-92) was an R-class coastal and harbor defense submarine of the United States Navy.

Construction and commissioning
R-15′s keel was laid down by the Union Iron Works in San Francisco, California, on 30 April 1917. She was launched on 12 October 1917, sponsored by Mrs. Thales S. Boyd, and commissioned on 27 July 1918.

Service history

1918–1931

Following shakedown, R-15 conducted operations in waters adjacent to the Panama Canal Zone. Based at Balboa through December 1918, she returned to California in January 1919; operated between San Pedro, California, and San Diego, California, until March; then proceeded to Mare Island Naval Shipyard for overhaul prior to her transfer to Pearl Harbor's Naval Submarine Base Pearl Harbor. Arriving there on 25 June, R-15 was given hull classification symbol SS-92 in July 1920. She remained in Hawaiian waters, participating in the development of submarine warfare tactics until 12 December 1930, when she got underway for the East Coast and inactivation.

Decommissioned at Philadelphia, Pennsylvania, on 7 May 1931, R-15 remained in the Reserve Fleet until ordered to New London, Connecticut, for activation in the summer of 1940.

1940–1945
Arriving in the Thames River on 9 September, she recommissioned 1 April, and in June sailed south for duty in the Canal Zone. For the next three months she operated with SubRon 3. On 3 October she got underway for New London, arriving on 23 October and reporting for duty in SubRon 7.

Patrol duties off the coast followed the entry of the United States into World War II. In February 1942 she again sailed south. In early March she patrolled in the Virgin Islands area then shifted to training and patrol duties out of Trinidad.  Relieved in early August, R-15 returned to the Virgin Islands thence continued on to Bermuda and with the fall, back to New London.

In December, R-15 returned to the Caribbean Sea and operated out of Guantanamo Bay. Further training duties in waters adjacent to the Virgin Islands and off Bermuda followed, and in April 1944 she returned to New London. Following ten months of operating out of New London, R-15 returned to the Bermuda area on 14 December. For the remainder of the war she operated off the Florida coast and from 1 March to 17 June 1945, from Guantanamo Bay. On 2 September she put into Key West, Florida, to complete her last tour.

R-15 was decommissioned 17 September 1945, struck from the Naval Vessel Register on 11 October 1945, and sold the same month to Macey O. Scott of Miami, Florida.

References

External links
 

R-15 (SS-92)
World War I submarines of the United States
World War II submarines of the United States
Ships built in San Francisco
1917 ships